Cooper's mountain squirrel (Paraxerus cooperi) is a species of rodent in the family Sciuridae found in Cameroon and Nigeria. Its natural habitat is subtropical or tropical moist montane forests.

References

Paraxerus
Mammals described in 1950
Taxonomy articles created by Polbot